San Manuel Airport , also known as San Manuel Ray Blair Airport, is a public-use airport that is publicly owned by Pinal County. It was formerly owned by BHP, owners of the San Manuel Copper Mine.

Although most U.S. airports use the same three-letter location identifier for the FAA, IATA, and ICAO San Manuel Airport is only assigned  E77 by the FAA.

Facilities and aircraft 
It has one runway with edge lights: 

For the 12-month period ending April 19, 2017, the airport had 14,010 aircraft operations, an average of 38 per day: 100% general aviation. At that time there were 20 aircraft based at this airport: 75% single-engine, 20% ultralight, no multi-engine, no jet, and 5% helicopters.

References

External links 
San Manuel Airport (E77) at Arizona DOT airport directory
San Manuel Airport at San Manuel tourism 
 

Airports in Pinal County,  Arizona